Émilie Deleuze (born 7 May 1964) is a French film director and screenwriter. She has directed eight films since 1986. Her film Peau neuve was screened in the Un Certain Regard section at the 1999 Cannes Film Festival. She is the daughter of the French philosopher Gilles Deleuze.

Filmography
 Monsieur Pierre (1986)
 Coup de sang (1990)
 Va mourir (1991)
 Peau neuve (1999)
 Lettre à Abou (2001)
 Pas d'histoires! (2001)
 Mister V. (2003)
 À deux c'est plus facile (2009)
 Tout est permis (TV) (2014)
 Jamais contente (2016)

References

External links

1964 births
Living people
French film directors
French women film directors
French women screenwriters
French screenwriters